Verdenius is a surname. Notable people with the surname include:

 Jan Jacob Verdenius (born 1973), Norwegian skier
 Willem Jacob Verdenius (1913–1998), Dutch classicist